Belgium competed at the Eurovision Song Contest 1992, represented by Morgane with "Nous, on veut des violons".

Before Eurovision

Finale nationale Concours Eurovision de la Chanson 
The Walloon broadcaster, RTBF, was in charge of the Belgian Eurovision entry for the Eurovision Song Contest 1992, held in Malmö, Sweden. The selection was hosted by Thierry Luthers and the winner was chosen by five regional juries (Brabant, Hainaut, Liège, Luxembourg, Namur), plus a jury consisting of music professionals.

Voting

At Eurovision
Morgane performed 2nd in the running order of the contest, following Spain and preceding Israel. "Nous, on veut violons" received 11 points, placing 20th of 23 countries competing.

Voting

References

1992
Countries in the Eurovision Song Contest 1992
Eurovision